Behesht Makan (also Romanized as Behesht Makān; also known as Bashtakān) is a village in Shesh Pir Rural District, Hamaijan District, Sepidan County, Fars Province, Iran. At the 2006 census, its population was 243, in 51 families.

References 

Populated places in Sepidan County